Head Above Water may refer to:
 Head Above Water (album), by Avril Lavigne, 2019
 "Head Above Water" (song), from the above album, 2018
 "Head Above Water", a 2012 song by Men Without Hats from Love in the Age of War
 Head Above Water (film), directed by Jim Wilson and released in 1996
 Head above Water, autobiography by Buchi Emecheta